Nozières is a commune in the Cher department in the Centre-Val de Loire region of France.

Geography
The A71 autoroute runs through the centre of the commune’s territory.

Population

Sights
 The church of St. Paxent, dating from the eleventh century.
 A sixteenth-century manorhouse.

See also
Communes of the Cher department

References

External links

Annuaire Mairie website 

Communes of Cher (department)